André Schalk Wessel Swarts (born ) is a South African rugby union player for  in the Currie Cup and the Rugby Challenge. His regular position is fly-half.

References

1995 births
Living people
Rugby union players from Welkom
Rugby union fly-halves
Griquas (rugby union) players
RC Narbonne players
South African rugby union players